The King Club is a live music club in Madison, Wisconsin famous for showcasing some of the world's most famous rhythm and blues acts.  It is one block from the State Capitol at 114 King Street.

The King Club featured James Brown's former drummer Clyde Stubblefield every Monday with his Madison R&B band.

The King Club closed permanently January 21, 2008.

External links

King Club site and schedule

Music venues in Wisconsin